Nayudo Rural LLG is a local-level government (LLG) of Madang Province, Papua New Guinea. The Domung language is spoken in the LLG.                                  
Ward name#. Councillor name's.
01.kopbo.  Paul lukas 
02. Tapen station.kison Yayena
03. Aunon.Ben Foike
04. Boana.Sonny Sapun
05. Tazon.Jeffery Quasenu
06. Kwembum.mark kosmin
07. Weskokop.Jacob.Triro
08. Taep.Kopingkeo Fonu
09. Bambu.Yuape Bowozong.
10. Meweng.Deecees/died.
11. Gumase.senuka kaku
12. Gwarawon.Fosne Buro
13. Miok.Bomemba Wasao
14. Tariknan.Basawe Banongan
15. Mibu.Mark Mutriwe

References

Local-level governments of Madang Province